I Miss You is a 2019 Bolivian drama film directed by . It was selected as the Bolivian entry for the Best International Feature Film at the 92nd Academy Awards, but it was not nominated.

Plot
After his son dies by suicide, a father arrives in New York to confront his son's boyfriend.

Cast
 Oscar Martínez as Jorge
 Rossy de Palma as Rosaura
 Fernando Barbosa as Sebastian
 Rick Cosnett as Chase
 Dominic Colón as Alonso
 Ana Asensio as Andrea

Reception

Accolades

See also
 List of submissions to the 92nd Academy Awards for Best International Feature Film
 List of Bolivian submissions for the Academy Award for Best International Feature Film

References

External links
 

2019 films
2019 drama films
2019 LGBT-related films
2010s Spanish-language films
Bolivian romantic drama films
Bolivian LGBT-related films
Gay-related films
LGBT-related romantic drama films